Ryan James Hoyt (born August 10, 1979) is a former associate of Jesse James Hollywood and was convicted of the murder of Nicholas Markowitz on August 9, 2000. He reportedly owed Hollywood money for drugs and was offered the opportunity to kill Markowitz as a way of erasing his debt.

During his trial, Hoyt took the stand and told the court he did not remember confessing to killing Markowitz. In November 2001, Hoyt was convicted of first-degree murder and was sentenced to death.

In the film Alpha Dog, the character Elvis Schmidt was modeled after Hoyt. The role was played by actor Shawn Hatosy.

See all
 List of death row inmates in the United States

References

1979 births
Living people
American murderers of children
American people convicted of murder
American prisoners sentenced to death
Prisoners sentenced to death by California
People convicted of murder by California
Criminals from California